The Charles Eversole House, also known as the Eversole-Hall House, is a historic house located at 509 County Road 523 near Whitehouse Station in Readington Township, Hunterdon County, New Jersey. It was added to the National Register of Historic Places on February 1, 2006, for its significance in architecture. The house was purchased by the township in 1988 for use as a museum, which opened in 1991.

History
Abraham Hall, a shoemaker, purchased it in 1832 from Eversole's grandson.

See also
 List of museums in New Jersey

References

Readington Township, New Jersey
Historic house museums in New Jersey
Houses completed in 1790
1790 establishments in New Jersey
National Register of Historic Places in Hunterdon County, New Jersey
Houses on the National Register of Historic Places in New Jersey
New Jersey Register of Historic Places
Houses in Hunterdon County, New Jersey